The 1998–99 Michigan State Spartans men's basketball team represented Michigan State University in the 1998–99 NCAA Division I men's basketball season. The team played their home games at Breslin Center in East Lansing, Michigan and were coached by fourth-year head coach, Tom Izzo. The Spartans finished the season 33–5, 15–1 to win the Big Ten regular season championship by three games. MSU defeated Northwestern, Wisconsin, and Illinois to win the Big Ten tournament and received the conference's automatic bid to the NCAA tournament. As the No. 1 seed in the Midwest region, they defeated Mount Saint Mary's and Ole Miss to advance to their second straight Sweet Sixteen. In the Sweet Sixteen they defeated Oklahoma to advance to the school's first Elite Eight since 1979. In the Elite Eight, they defeated Kentucky to earn a trip to the Final Four for the first time since 1979. There they lost No. 1-ranked Duke. The 33 wins marked a school record for wins in a season.

Previous season 
The Spartans finished the 1997–98 season 22–8, 13–3 in Big Ten play to earn a share of the Big Ten regular season championship. They lost in the quarterfinals of the inaugural Big Ten tournament to Minnesota. Michigan State received an at-large bid as a No. 4 seed in the NCAA tournament, their first trip to the Tournament under Tom Izzo. They defeated Eastern Michigan and Princeton to advance to the Sweet Sixteen before losing to No. 1-seeded North Carolina.

Season summary 
The Spartans, fresh off their first trip to the Sweet Sixteen since 1990, started the season ranked No. 5 in the country. Michigan State was led by juniors Mateen Cleaves (11.7 points and 7.2 assists per game) and Morris Peterson (13.6 points and 5.7 rebounds per game).

The Spartans played three top seven teams in their first seven games. MSU lost all three: at No. 7 Temple, versus No. 4 Duke at the United Center in Chicago, Illinois, and at No. 1 Connecticut. However, the Spartans finished the non–conference season without another loss and a record of 11–3 while ranked No. 14 in the country.

After losing their first Big Ten game to No. 24 Wisconsin, the Spartans won the remaining 15 games in conference. The wins included wins against No. 19 Minnesota, No. 14 Iowa, at No. 18 Indiana, No. 15 Ohio State, at No. 14 Iowa, at No. 22 Minnesota, No. 17 Purdue, No. 14 Wisconsin, and at No. 23 Purdue. The Spartans won the Big Ten conference regular season by three games with a record of 15–1. MSU finished the regular season ranked No. 2 in the country. (Ohio State, who finished in second place with a 12–4 record, was later forced to vacate 29 games including all conference wins.)

The Spartans earned the No. 1 seed in the Big Ten tournament and faced Northwestern in the quarterfinals. MSU struggled in the game and appeared to be headed toward a second-straight early exit from only the second-ever Big Ten tournament, but Matteen Cleaves hit a clutch shot with 37 second remaining to give MSU a two-point win. In the semifinals, MSU faced No. 19 Wisconsin, the only team that had beaten MSU in the regular season. The Spartans held Wisconsin scoreless for nearly 11 minutes in the second half on their way to 56–41 win. The win propelled the Spartans to the championship game against Cinderalla Illinois, who had finished last in conference, but had made a run to the championship game. With MSU looking to lock up a No. 1 seed in the NCAA Tournament and Illinois looking to simply make the Tournament with a win, the Spartans blew out the Illini 67–50 to win their first Big Ten tournament championship. The win gave the Spartans the conference's automatic bid to the NCAA tournament.

The Spartans were awarded a No. 1 seed in the Midwest Region. In a First Round victory over Mount St. Mary's, MSU used tough defense to hold off the Mountaineers, 76–53. In the Second Round, the Spartans faced No. 9-seeded Mississippi. Michigan State used a late 13–0 run to hold off the upset and defeat the Rebels, 73–66. Cleaves led the Spartans with 18 points as they advanced to their second straight Sweet Sixteen. In the Sweet Sixteen, No. 13-seeded Oklahoma pushed the Spartans and MSU struggled offensively. However, Andre Hutson's 13 points led the Spartans to hard-fought 54–46 win, their 21st straight win. In the Elite Eight for the first time since winning the championship since 1979, MSU faced No. 3-seeded and No. 8-ranked Kentucky. Michigan State trailed by as many 13 points early in the contest, but they fought back to beat Kentucky 73–66 to advance to the Final Four. There, they were re-matched against the overall No. 1 seed, Duke, who had defeated them 73–67 early in the season. With the Spartans riding a 22-game winning streak, Duke was able to beat the Spartans 68–62, ending their season.

Roster and statistics

Schedule and results

|-
!colspan=9 style=| Exhibition

|-
!colspan=9 style=| Non-conference regular season

|-
!colspan=9 style=|Big Ten regular season

|-
!colspan=9 style=|Big Ten tournament

|- 
!colspan=9 style=|NCAA tournament

Rankings

Awards and honors
Mateen Cleaves – All-America selection
Mateen Cleaves – Big Ten Player of the Year
Mateen Cleaves – All-Big Ten First Team
Mateen Cleaves – Chicago Tribune Silver Basketball
Mateen Cleaves – Most Outstanding Player, Big Ten Conference Basketball Tournament
Morris Peterson – All-Big Ten First Team
Antonio Smith – All-Big Ten Third Team

References

Michigan State Spartans men's basketball seasons
Michigan State Spartans
Big Ten men's basketball tournament championship seasons
NCAA Division I men's basketball tournament Final Four seasons
Michigan State
Michigan State Spartans men's b
Michigan State Spartans men's b